The EMD SD32ECO is a  C-C diesel-electric locomotive rebuilt by Electro-Motive Diesel. It is primarily the application of a conversion kit to an existing EMD SD60-type locomotive. This involves replacing the existing 710G3A V16 prime mover with an EPA Tier-II-compliant 710G3B-T2 turbocharged V12 engine, with electronic fuel injection. Many of the donor SD60's major components and subsystems are recycled, and are recertified as equal to new. However, the locomotive's control system is all new.

Owners
Starting in 2012, twenty eight Union Pacific SD60Ms were sent to Electro Motive Diesel for this rebuild and are in revenue service as UP 9900-9927. SD59MX is the Union Pacific designation for this type.

BNSF sent 3 SD45-2 locomotives to be rebuilt as SD32ECOs. Unlike UP's SD59MX, BNSF's SD32ECOs retain the appearance of an SD45-2. So far, 3 have been completed as BNSF 1350-1352.

UP SD59MX Features
The SD59MX is remanufactured from the carbody and major mechanical and electrical subsystems of an EMD SD60M "donor". The EFI-equipped 710 engine, however, is all new as are the engine and locomotive control systems. Union Pacific is the first Class I railroad to order them. The engine control system is adaptable to both minimum emissions and minimum fuel consumption modes, depending upon their assignment.

Appearance
The external appearance of the converted locomotive is sometimes altered by application of a flared radiator section, similar to the SD70M-2 and SD70ACe Tier-II, and similar to late model SD70M and SD70MAC locomotives in appearance. The recently converted locomotives (including UP 9905 and 9906, seen recently at the CSRM; and others up to at least UP 9924) have also had the SD70M-2/SD70ACe-style safety fuel tanks applied.

References
 Railfan And Railroad Magazine, October 2009, page 22
 710ECO Repower Solutions by EMD. Retrieved on September 23, 2009

Diesel-electric locomotives of the United States
C-C locomotives
SD32ECO
EPA Tier 2-compliant locomotives of the United States
Rebuilt locomotives
Standard gauge locomotives of the United States